The 2018 National Oil Corporation attack was a terrorist attack that occurred on 10 September 2018, in which at least six gunmen from the Islamic State of Iraq and the Levant in Libya carried out an attack, taking several hostages and killing at least 2 staff members from the National Oil Corporation. During the attack, a shootout occurred with security forces loyal to the Tripoli-based government. An al-Jazeera journalist reported that the gunmen attacked the main gate of the facility, and the attack caused a wave of panic in Tripoli.

Reactions
: Italian Foreign Minister Enzo Milanesi condemned the attack in a phone call to Fayez al-Sarraj.

See also
In Amenas hostage crisis

References

ISIL terrorist incidents
Islamic terrorism in Libya
Islamic terrorist incidents in 2018
ISIL terrorist incidents in Libya
Terrorist incidents in Libya in 2018
2018 murders in Libya